Arvo Haanpää (12 September 1898 – 5 May 1980) was a Finnish equestrian. He competed in two events at the 1948 Summer Olympics.

References

External links
 

1898 births
1980 deaths
Finnish male equestrians
Olympic equestrians of Finland
Equestrians at the 1948 Summer Olympics
People from Jalasjärvi
Sportspeople from South Ostrobothnia